The Monito skink (Spondylurus monitae) is a species of skink found on Monito Island in Puerto Rico.

References

Spondylurus
Reptiles described in 2012
Reptiles of the Caribbean
Endemic fauna of the Caribbean
Taxa named by Stephen Blair Hedges
Taxa named by Caitlin E. Conn